"Ball of Fire" is a song recorded by Tommy James and the Shondells for their 1969 greatest hits album, The Best of Tommy James and The Shondells. The song reached #19 on The Billboard Hot 100 in 1969. The song also reached #8 in Canada.

References

1969 songs
1969 singles
Songs written by Tommy James
Songs written by Bruce Sudano
Tommy James and the Shondells songs
Roulette Records singles